The Port of Dapitan, locally and originally known as Pulauan Port, is a seaport in Dapitan, Philippines. It is owned and managed by Philippine Ports Authority and is the baseport of the Port Management Office Zamboanga del Norte.

History

The Port of Dapitan started as one of the sub-ports of the Port Management Unit (PMU) of Zamboanga in 1977, at the time when the Philippine Ports Authority (PPA) took over the port operations, development, and management from the Bureau of Customs. As the port was originally known as Pulauan Port, the Local Government of Dapitan through their Sangguniang Bayan passed Resolution No. 26-1999 renaming the port as Port of Dapitan. It would later be reclassified as Terminal Management Office of Dapitan (TMO-Dapitan) under the Port Management Office of Zamboanga (PMO-Zamboanga), Port District Office of Southern Mindanao (PDO-Southern Mindanao).

TMO-Dapitan's administrative jurisdiction was transferred to the Port Management Office of Ozamiz (PMO-Ozamiz) under the Port District Office of Northern Mindanao (PDO-Northern Mindanao) in 1995. In 2008, TMO-Dapitan was reclassified as Port Management Office of Dapitan (PMO-Dapitan), but at that time have no terminal port under its jurisdiction. In 2009, the jurisdiction of ten government ports and two private ports were transferred to PMO-Dapitan from PMO-Ozamiz; and PMO-Dapitan was transferred back to PDO-Southern Mindanao.

Statistics

Incidents
 On the early morning of August 28, 2019, M/V Lite Ferry 16 of Lite Shipping Corporation was caught on fire near the engine room at Tag-ulo Point, about 3 kilometers off Pulauan Port with at least 4 passengers dead.

See also
List of ports in the Philippines
Dapitan

References

Dipolog Port
Dapitan
Transportation in Mindanao